Magalhães (pronounced  or ) is a Portuguese surname, sometimes rendered in English as Magellan.
It may refer to:

General
Álvaro Magalhães (writer), Portuguese writer
Ana Maria Magalhães, Brazilian film actress and director
Antônio Carlos Magalhães, Brazilian politician
Armindo Freitas-Magalhães, Portuguese psychologist
Carlos Leôncio de Magalhães, Brazilian farmer and businessman
Fernando Magalhães, Brazilian obstetrician
Fernão de Magalhães (Ferdinand Magellan) (1480-1521), Portuguese explorer who led the first expedition around the world
Filipe de Magalhães, Portuguese composer
Gabriel de Magalhães (1610-1677), Portuguese Jesuit missionary in China
Gonçalves de Magalhães, Brazilian poet, playwright, medician and diplomat
Joaquim Magalhães Mota, Portuguese lawyer and politician
José de Magalhães Pinto, Brazilian politician and banker
José Roberto Magalhães Teixeira, Brazilian politician
Mallu Magalhães, Brazilian musician
Marcos Magalhães, Brazilian film director
Rosa Magalhães, Brazilian carnival artist
Solange Magalhães, Brazilian painter
João Pedro de Magalhães, Portuguese microbiologist

Sports
Álvaro Magalhães, Portuguese footballer
Bruno Magalhães, Rallycar driver
Carlos de Oliveira Magalhães, Portuguese footballer
Cleidimar Magalhães Silva, Brazilian footballer
Evandro Teixeira Magalhães, Brazilian footballer
Fábio Luiz Magalhães, Brazilian beach volleyballer
Gabriel Magalhães, Brazilian footballer
Jaime Magalhães, Portuguese footballer
Luís Magalhães, Portuguese basketball coach
Luís Pedro Magalhães, Portuguese auto racing driver
Vinny Magalhães, Brazilian martial artist
Vinicius Magalhães (Draculino), Brazilian martial artist
 

Portuguese-language surnames